Big Bear Records is the oldest independent British record label set up in 1968 by Jim Simpson in Birmingham, England. It specialises in blues and jazz recordings.

History 
Big Bear Records was founded by promoter and band manager Jim Simpson in 1968, taking its name from the nickname given to Simpson by Radio 1 DJ John Peel. At the time, Simpson was managing The Locomotive, who had just scored a top 40 hit with "Rudi's In Love". After Parlophone, the band's existing label, declined to release the planned follow-up recording "Rudi The Red Nosed Reindeer", Simpson decided to set up his own Big Bear Records label to release the single (with the band renamed Steam Shovel for contractual reasons), with initial distribution from Island Records.

During 1968, Simpson established the weekly Henry's Blueshouse club night at The Crown Hotel on Station Street in Birmingham. Early members of the club included Ozzy Osbourne and Tony Iommi, who one week approached Simpson to request a support slot at a future gig for their band, then known as Earth. Simpson would go on to manage Earth, who soon changed their name to Black Sabbath. Under Simpson's management, they reached number one on the album chart with Paranoid, before leaving him in 1970.

Following this, Simpson began to focus his attention on recording and touring American bluesmen, under the billing American Blues Legends. Featuring musicians including Tommy Tucker, Willie Mabon, Homesick James, Doctor Ross, Snooky Pryor, Cousin Joe, Eddie "Guitar" Burns, Champion Jack Dupree and Eddie Playboy Taylor, Big Bear released a total of 21 albums of American blues during the 1970s.

The 1980s saw Big Bear Records returning to Simpson's first love, mainstream jazz and swing. Assembling a lineup of leading British jazz musicians including Humphrey Lyttelton, Dick Morrissey, Digby Fairweather, Dave Shepherd and Jim Douglas, Big Bear promoted a live jam session on 12 August 1984 at Birmingham's Cannon Hill Park, recorded and released on LP as The M&B Jam Session. The success of the event provided the impetus for the first Birmingham International Jazz Festival the following summer, which continues to be organised annually by Big Bear Music every July. In 1987, Big Bear launched The Jazz Rag magazine, which continues to publish bi-monthly, as well as The British Jazz Awards. The first edition of the awards was marked with a ceremony at Birmingham's Grand Hotel, where the jam session featuring the poll winners was recorded and released as the British Jazz Awards 1987 album.

Big Bear Records continued to work with prominent names in British jazz into the 1990s, releasing albums by Lady Sings The Blues (fronted by Val Wiseman), Kenny Baker's Dozen, Bruce Adams and Alan Barnes.

Discography

See also
 List of record labels

References

External links
 Big Bear Music Group homepage
 Illustrated Big Bear Records discography
 List of 7 inch 45 rpms

British record labels
Blues record labels
Jazz record labels